Jawahar Navodaya Vidyalaya, Yanam or locally known as JNV Mettakur is a boarding, co-educational  school in Yanam district of Puducherry U.T. in India. Navodaya Vidyalayas are funded by the Indian Ministry of Human Resources Development and administered  by Navodaya Vidyalaya Smiti, an autonomous body under the ministry. Navodaya Vidyalayas provide free education to talented children from Class VI to XII. Yanam district is a coastal enclave within Andhra Pradesh state, located about 815 km from union territory headquarter Pondicherry.

History 
The school was established in 1987, and is a part of Jawahar Navodaya Vidyalaya schools. This school is administered and monitored by Hyderabad regional office of Navodaya Vidyalaya Smiti.

Admission 
Admission to JNV Yanam at class VI level is made through selection test (JNVST) conducted by Navodaya Vidyalaya Smiti. The information about test is disseminated and advertised in district by the office of Yanam district magistrate (Collector), who is also the chairperson of Vidyalya Management Committee of JNV Yanam.

Affiliations 
JNV Yanam is affiliated to Central Board of Secondary Education with affiliation number 130014.

See also 

 Jawahar Navodaya Vidyalaya, Puducherry
 Jawahar Navodaya Vidyalaya, Karaikal
 Jawahar Navodaya Vidyalaya, Mahe
 List of JNV schools

References

External links 

 Official Website of JNV Yanam

High schools and secondary schools in Puducherry
Yanam
Educational institutions established in 1987
1987 establishments in Pondicherry
Yanam district